KFUR-LP (101.1 FM) is a low-power FM radio station broadcasting a regional Mexican music format. Licensed to St. George, Utah, United States, the station is currently owned by Latinos Unidos Broadcasting.

See also
KDYL (AM), an associated station in Salt Lake City

References

External links
 

FUR-LP
Radio stations established in 2003
Regional Mexican radio stations in the United States
FUR-LP